Barfrestone is a village in East Kent, England, and between Shepherdswell, Eythorne  and Nonington, and close to the pit villages of Elvington and Snowdown.

Alternative spellings are Barfreston and Barfreystone. The old pronunciation was "Barson" (before 1800) and the ancient name, "Barfriston".
Now known as "Bar-fre-ston", rather than "Bar-fre-stone".

At the time of the Domesday Book, when the name was written 'Berfrestone', the manor was owned by Odo, Earl of Kent (as the Bishop of Bayeux). But after his trial (for fraud) in 1076, his assets were re-apportioned, including Barfrestone. The lands were then granted to Hugh de Port (an English feudal barony) for the defence of Dover Castle. The lands passed through the hands of many other owners including Sir Thomas Browne (during the reign of Henry VI of England).

Landmarks include the Grade I listed Norman church, which contains significant carvings of human and animal figures on both the exterior and interior of the church, as well as a very early post-Roman example of the Greek key motif carved on the inside coving. Also of note is the church bell set in a yew tree adjacent to the church and "Little Ewell", a converted rectory which, until 2013, was the location of the centre (house, offices and workshops) of the L'Arche Kent Community which has since moved to Canterbury, though a L'Arche house remains in the nearby village of Eythorne.

Another listed building in the village is Grade II listed Barfrestone Court,

The village is on the Miner's Way Trail which links the coalfield parishes of East Kent.

References

External links
 
 

Norman architecture in England
Hamlets in Kent